Cechenena transpacifica is a moth of the  family Sphingidae. It is known from the Philippines.

This moth is similar to Cechenena chimaera, but the basal area of the forewing underside is reddish-ochre. Adults are sexually dimorphic. The intensity of the dark pattern of the forewing upperside in males is highly variable, ranging from very heavily marked to nearly unmarked.

References

Cechenena
Moths described in 1923